Niren De was an Indian Lawyer and was the Attorney General of India from November 1968 to March 1977 and it covered Indian Emergency. He was earlier the Solicitor General of India. He was awarded the Padma Vibhushan in 1974. He was also the Chairman of the Bar council of India.

References

1908 births
Year of death unknown
Recipients of the Padma Vibhushan in public affairs
20th-century Indian lawyers
India
Solicitors General of India